Hey! Hey! USA is a 1938 British comedy film starring comedian Will Hay, Edgar Kennedy and Eddie Ryan. Hay appears as Benjamin Twist, a porter who accidentally finds himself on a ship bound for the United States. The film features an early appearance by child actor Roddy McDowall, before he went to live in America.

Plot outline

Benjamin Twist, a teacher working during school holidays as a ship's porter ends up on a ship bound for America and impersonating a professor, Phineas Tavistock. Along with American gangster and stowaway Bugs Leary (Edgar Kennedy), Twist finds himself entangled in a plot to kidnap the son of a millionaire whom 'Professor' Tavistock is teaching.  Things are further complicated by the fact that two sets of gangsters are attempting to get their hands on the ransom money, which Twist is given to hand over.

Cast
 Will Hay - Benjamin Twist/Professor Phineas Tavistock
 Edgar Kennedy - Bugs Leary
 David Burns - Tony Ricardo
 Eddie Ryan - Ace Marco
 Fred Duprez - Cyrus Schultz
 Paddy Reynolds - Mrs Schultz
 Tommy Bupp - Bertie Schultz
 Arthur Goullet - Glove Johnson
 Gibb McLaughlin - Steward
 Eddie Pola - Broadcast Announcer
 Roddy McDowall - Boy
 Peter Gawthorne - Ship's Captain
 Charlie Hall - Leary's Pal
 Charles Oliver - Curly
 Danny Green - McGuire, the Chicago cop
 John Salew  (Uncredited)
 Hugh McDermott  (Uncredited)

Critical reception
Sky Movies wrote, "incomparable Will Hay reprises his splendidly shifty Dr Benjamin Twist character (the incompetent headmaster of St Michael's) in this breezy British comedy set in a quaintly observed America full of gun-toting gangsters. Comic stalwart Edgar Kennedy provides slow-burning support under the direction of Marcel Varnel, the dapper Frenchman who made most of Hay's biggest successes. "

Bibliography
 Slide, Anthony. 'Banned in the USA': British Films in the United States and their Censorship, 1933-1960. I.B. Tauris & Co, 1998.

External links

References

British comedy films
1938 films
British black-and-white films
1938 comedy films
Films directed by Marcel Varnel
Compositions by Charles Williams
1930s British films